Noel Murphy may refer to:

 Noel Murphy (rugby union, born 1904) (1904–1987), Ireland rugby union international
 Noel Murphy (rugby union, born 1937), former Irish rugby union player
 Noel Murphy (musician) (born 1943), Irish-born singer, guitarist and humourist
 Noel Murphy (politician) (1915–2005), Canadian politician
 Noel Murphy (comedian) (born 1961), American stand-up comedian and film director